Marko Kauppinen (born 23 March 1979) is a Finnish former professional ice hockey defenceman who played in the Liiga and Swedish Hockey League (SHL). Kauppinen was selected by the Philadelphia Flyers in the 8th round (214th overall) of the 1997 NHL Entry Draft. On 3 September 2014, Kauppinen left the Finnish Liiga and signed a one-year contract with Swedish club, Modo Hockey in the SHL.

References

External links
 

1979 births
Living people
AIK IF players
Finnish ice hockey defencemen
HC TPS players
Jokerit players
JYP Jyväskylä players
KalPa players
Kiekko-Vantaa players
Mikkelin Jukurit players
Modo Hockey players
Mora IK players
People from Mikkeli
Philadelphia Flyers draft picks
Tappara players
Sportspeople from South Savo